Julio Segundo Machado Rondón (born December 1, 1965) is a Venezuelan former Major League Baseball (MLB) right-handed relief pitcher who played for the New York Mets (1989–90) and Milwaukee Brewers (1990–91). Machado's MLB career was cut short when he was imprisoned on involuntary murder charges in Venezuela. He later coached and played in Venezuelan winter baseball leagues.

MLB career
Machado started his career with the Mets. He was demoted to the Class AAA Tidewater team, where he saved eight games before being recalled to the Mets in July. At the time, the Mets were looking for consistent right-handed relief pitchers, having traded Roger McDowell the previous year.

Later that season, Machado was traded to the Brewers, along with pitcher Kevin Brown, in exchange for catcher Charlie O'Brien and a minor league player.

Machado had a decent fastball, good control and willingness to challenge hitters. He also pitched a better-than-average curveball and a slider.

In a three-year career, Machado posted a 7–5 record with 151 strikeouts and a 3.12 ERA in 147 innings.

Shooting
Spending the 1991 offseason in his homeland, Machado fatally shot a woman following an auto accident on December 8. More than two weeks later, Machado was missing and the Brewers said that they were planning for 1992 with the assumption that Machado would not be on the team. Though he was described as a fugitive, Venezuelan reporters said that Machado would probably turn himself in after the holidays. He was held in a Caracas prison while an investigation was carried out from the middle of January to early March. He admitted that he fired the shots, but he said that he did so in self-defense, afraid that he was being robbed.

When Machado was granted conditional freedom pending a trial on charges of involuntary murder, he was not allowed to leave Venezuela. Shortly thereafter, thieves stole the car of the prosecutor in Machado's case and they set it on fire. Machado was convicted and, following appeals, he was sentenced to 12 years in 1996. He was released in 2000.

See also
 List of players from Venezuela in Major League Baseball

References

External links

1965 births
Águilas del Zulia players
Clearwater Phillies players
Jackson Mets players
Living people
Major League Baseball pitchers
Major League Baseball players from Venezuela
Milwaukee Brewers players
New York Mets players
Peninsula Pilots players
People from Zulia
Reading Phillies players
Spartanburg Phillies players
Spartanburg Suns players
Sportspeople convicted of murder
St. Lucie Mets players
Tidewater Tides players
Venezuelan expatriate baseball players in the United States
Venezuelan people convicted of murder